The North Haledon School District is a comprehensive community public school district that serves students in kindergarten through eighth grade from North Haledon, in Passaic County, New Jersey, United States.

As of the 2018–19 school year, the district, comprising two schools, had an enrollment of 624 students and 59.3 classroom teachers (on an FTE basis), for a student–teacher ratio of 10.5:1.

The district is classified by the New Jersey Department of Education as being in District Factor Group "FG", the fourth-highest of eight groupings. District Factor Groups organize districts statewide to allow comparison by common socioeconomic characteristics of the local districts. From lowest socioeconomic status to highest, the categories are A, B, CD, DE, FG, GH, I and J.

For ninth through twelfth grades, public school students attend Manchester Regional High School, which serves students from Haledon, North Haledon, and Prospect Park. The school is located in Haledon. The district participates in the Interdistrict Public School Choice Program, which allows non-resident students to attend the district's schools without cost to their parents, with tuition paid by the state. Available slots are announced annually by grade. North Haledon residents had successfully voted in 2003 to leave the district, choosing to send their high school aged students to Midland Park High School in nearby Bergen County, New Jersey. In August 2004, the New Jersey Supreme Court decided against North Haledon, citing that the town's exit from the district would shift the ethnic and racial balance of the high school.  As of the 2018–19 school year, the high school had an enrollment of 833 students and 62.3 classroom teachers (on an FTE basis), for a student–teacher ratio of 13.4:1.

In recent years however, many students have been attending many other schools, with a smaller number attending Manchester Regional High School. These schools include DePaul Catholic High School, Paramus Catholic High School, Don Bosco Preparatory High School, Bergen Catholic High School, and Passaic County Technical Institute.

Schools
Schools in the district (with 2018–19 enrollment data from the National Center for Education Statistics) are:
Elementary school
Memorial School with 344 students in grades K–4
Melissa Tait, Principal
Middle school
High Mountain School with 275 students in grades 5–8
Antonella Lind, Principal

Administration
Core members of the district's administration are:
Nicholas S. Coffaro, Superintendent
Debra Andreniuk, Business Administrator

Board of education
The district's board of education, with nine members, sets policy and oversees the fiscal and educational operation of the district through its administration. As a Type II school district, the board's trustees are elected directly by voters to serve three-year terms of office on a staggered basis, with three seats up for election each year held (since 2013) as part of the November general election.

References

External links
North Haledon School District

School Data for the North Haledon School District, National Center for Education Statistics
Manchester Regional High School

North Haledon, New Jersey
New Jersey District Factor Group FG
School districts in Passaic County, New Jersey